Calumet Fisheries is a seafood restaurant in the South Deering neighborhood of Chicago, Illinois, United States, directly next to the 95th Street bridge (which appears in the 1980 film The Blues Brothers). It was originally established in 1928, and subsequently purchased in 1948 by Sid Kotlick and Len Toll. It serves smoked and fried fish, shrimp, and clams. The restaurant is often featured on TV shows and web series', such as Eater's Dining on a Dime and Anthony Bourdain: No Reservations. The building is a one-room shack with a counter and no seating. Patrons can take their food to go, or (more commonly) sit in their parked cars along 95th Street to eat.

Smoking process 
The restaurant uses a natural-wood smokehouse, which has been in use since establishment. The smoking process involves brining the fish overnight, before large fish (such as salmon, sturgeon, or sablefish) are usually cut into "steaks", threaded with string, and hung from a smoking rack. Some salmon are smoked whole. Wood fires are built in the bottom of the smokehouse and the fish are cooked with the doors open; when complete, the doors are closed and the fish are smoked. Shrimp, clam strips, and smaller fish such as lake chub are smoked by tacking to a plank.

History 
Smoked fish were popular in the 1940s and 1950s, when shipping and fishing boat traffic were heavy on Chicago's waterways. The business began a slow decline over the decades, as the neighborhood and economy changed, and fried seafood was introduced to generate more sales. Due to declining demand, the owners had considered ending smoking and focusing on frying, until they were featured on No Reservations; a few days after the episode aired, patrons were lined up out the door and down the street, and sales continue to increase.

Awards and honors
Calumet Fisheries was named by CNN as one of America's 10 best historic restaurants. In 2010, it received a James Beard Foundation Award.

See also
 List of James Beard America's Classics
 List of seafood restaurants

References

Restaurants in Chicago
Restaurants established in 1928
Cuisine of Chicago
James Beard Foundation Award winners
Seafood restaurants in Illinois
1928 establishments in Illinois